Family album may refer to:

 A photo album containing family photographs

Literature
 Family Album (novel), a 1985 novel by Danielle Steel
 Family Album (play) a 1935 short play by Noël Coward

Music
 Family Album (David Allan Coe album) or the title song, 1978
 Family Album (Faun Fables album), 2004
 Family Album (Stoneground album), 1971
 The Family Album, an album by Rick Wakeman, 1987
 Family Album, an album by Lia Ices, 2021
 Steve Ashley's Family Album, a 1983 album by Steve Ashley

Television
 Family Album (1993 TV series), an American sitcom
 Family Album (miniseries), a 1994 American miniseries based on the Danielle Steel novel
 "Family Album" (The Colbys), an episode

See also